Marin Čilić defeated Kei Nishikori in the final, 6–3, 6–3, 6–3 to win the men's singles tennis title at the 2014 US Open. It was Čilić's first major title, and he became the second Croatian to win a Grand Slam men's singles title after his coach Goran Ivanišević at the 2001 Wimbledon Championships.

Rafael Nadal was the reigning champion, but withdrew before the tournament due to a right wrist injury.

Nishikori became the first Japanese in the Open Era to reach a major semifinal, and the first since Jiro Sato at the 1933 French Championships.

The finalists defeated Roger Federer and Novak Djokovic in their respective semifinals, guaranteeing a new major champion, the first major final with a guaranteed maiden champion since the 2008 Australian Open, and the first major final with two maiden finalists since the 2005 French Open. Nishikori and Čilić were also the two lowest-ranked seeds to reach the US Open final since 2002. Between the 2005 Australian Open and 2020 US Open, this was the only major final without one of the Big Four.

This marked the first US Open appearance for 2020 champion Dominic Thiem; he lost in the fourth round to Tomáš Berdych.

Seeds

Qualifying

Draw

Finals

Top half

Section 1

Section 2

Section 3

Section 4

Bottom half

Section 5

Section 6

Section 7

Section 8

Nationalities in the field

References

External links
 Association of Tennis Professionals (ATP) – 2014 US Open Men's Singles draw
2014 US Open – Men's draws and results at the International Tennis Federation

Men's Singles
US Open – Men's singles
US Open (tennis) by year – Men's singles